Jan van de Venne or Jan van der Venne, also known as Pseudo van de Venne (active by 1616 – died before 1651), was a Flemish painter of genre, religious scenes, and cabinets who was court painter to the governors of the Southern Netherlands.
Many of his works depict "low-life" genre scenes of tooth-pullers, card-players and hurdy-gurdy players, tronies and expressive religious scenes.

Rediscovery and identification

Works by Jan van de Venne were formerly attributed to an artist referred to as ‘Pseudo-Van de Venne’.  This Pseudo-Van de Venne was erroneously believed to be the brother, also called Jan, of the better known Dutch painter Adriaen van de Venne. Adriaen's brother Jan, however, died in Middelburg in 1625.

Art historian Jacques Foucart from the Louvre corrected the wrong attribution in an article published in 1978.   Foucart identified Pseudo-Van de Venne with another Jan van de Venne whom he identified as a Flemish artist.   This identification of ‘Pseudo-Van de Venne’ with Jan van de Venne, an artist believed to have been born in Mechelen c. 1600, has since gained wide acceptance.

Life
Very little is known about Jan van de Venne's life and career.  Even though some of the artist’s works bear the mark of the Antwerp Guild of Saint Luke, he is believed to have been active mainly in Brussels.  This is testified by his relationships with prominent personalities in Brussels including at the court. Both Cardinal-infant Ferdinand and Archduke Leopold Wilhelm, the governors of the Southern Netherlands, were his patrons.  Van de Venne is recorded as a master in the Guild of Saint Luke in Brussels in 1616.

He is believed to have been active as a painter as well as a gilder of moldings and perhaps even a painter of imitation marble on frames and altarpieces.  He remained active in Brussels where he died in or before 1651.

Work

General

Van de Venne left very few signed paintings. His oeuvre has been reconstituted based on signed or documented works which show his very individual style, subjects, use of light and brilliancy.  His works are   typically small-scale oil on panel compositions.

Van de Venne specialised in caricatures of so-called ‘low-life’ subjects, such as card-players, tooth-pullers and musicians, and in expressive religious scenes.  His paintings demonstrate harsh caricatures in a stronger light than Adriaen Brouwer.

Influences
Various historians have attempted to explain the origins of his style.  They have identified a range of influences on the work of van de Venne: his themes and style are reminiscent of his contemporary Adriaen Brouwer.  His preference for brownish tonalities and themes are similar to those of Dutch such as Adriaen van Ostade, Benjamin Cuyp and Andries Both.  His nervous style shows possibly the influence of David Teniers the Elder and some authors even conjecture he may have studied under Teniers. Lucas van Leyden's engravings as well Adam Elsheimer's treatment of the effects of light and shade are also cited as possible influences.  Some of his works have formerly been attributed to the style of Rembrandt.

Jan van de Venne is believed to have in turn exerted an influence on other contemporary artists.  For instance the Dutch Bambocciante painter Andries Both is believed to have derived his propensity for caricature-like distortions of the faces and poses of his figures from the compositions of van de Venne.

Tronies
Many of his works are caricatural portraits of heads.  The squeaky misery of the characters he depicts often in profile and the virtuosity of the pasty effects come close to the early production of Georges de La Tour. The use of light that make the clothes and folds flicker also evokes the last French Mannerists such as Claude Vignon or Claude Deruet.

Jan van de Venne occasionally used the paired model whereby two different tronies are paired up and juxtaposed with each other.

Gypsy scenes
Jan van de Venne regularly painted scenes with gypsies.  As many of these works with gypsies are in collections in French museums (Aix-en Provence, Auxerre, Besançon, Chambéry, Dijon, Dunkirk, Hazebrouck, Lille, Marseille, Louvre, Quimper and Semur-en-Auxois) he earned the sobriquet 'le Maître des Tziganes' (the Master of the Gypsies) in France.

An example of one of his gypsy scenes is the Gypsy family at the Louvre, which shows a gypsy family preparing an outdoor meal over a fire while a woman is delousing a child.

The Temptation of St Antony

He also painted various versions of The Temptation of St Antony.  This subject was very popular in Flemish art from the late 15th century.  Catholics regard Saint Anthony as a model to be emulated as he is believed to have resisted multiple temptations sent to him by the devil.  Flemish paintings dealing with the theme of the temptation of Saint Anthony are typically populated with witches and monstrous creatures that tempt him.  Van der Venne's versions of The Temptation of St Antony with different compositions are in museums in Dunkerque, Haarlem and Holbourne and one was sold at Auktionshaus im Kinsky on 28 November 2013 in Vienna (as lot 2).

The version sold at Auktionshaus im Kinsky shows St Anthony in a cave kneeling in front of a table with books. To his right appear fanciful phantoms and in the background a witch with a young woman.

References

Further reading
J. Foucart, 'Une fausse énigme: le pseudo et le véritable van de Venne', in: Revue de l'Art, 1978, p. 53-62

External links

Flemish genre painters
Flemish portrait painters
Flemish history painters
Flemish Baroque painters
Painters from Brussels
Artists from Mechelen
Year of birth uncertain